Sulcalization (from  'groove'), in phonetics, is the pronunciation of a sound, typically a sibilant consonant, such as English  and , with a deep groove running along the back of the tongue that focuses the airstream on the teeth, producing a more intense sound. This is accomplished by raising the sides of the back of the tongue ("lateral contraction") and leaving a hollow along the mid-line. It is not clear if all sibilants are grooved to at least some extent. Catford (1977) observed that the degree of tongue grooving differs between places of articulation as well as between languages; however, no language is known to contrast sibilants based purely on the presence or absence of tongue grooving.

English , which allows various tongue positions without apparent distinction, may also receive its characteristic quality from having a grooved tongue shape.  has also been reported to show tongue grooving in English, despite being a non-sibilant fricative (Stone & Lundberg 1996).

Albanian , but not , has also been described as being produced with accompanying sulcalization (Lowman 1932: 278).

In phonology and historical linguistics, sulcalization is the development of such a groove in a non-sulcal consonant. A similar sound change also took place in the history of the Senufo languages.

Vowels may also be sulcalized, which has been described as giving them a "throaty" sound (Jones 1967: 82). The  vowel of Received Pronunciation, which is normally described as a rounded, is pronounced by some speakers without rounded lips for whom the characteristic quality is rather one of sulcality (Lass 1984: 124).

One scholar has also suggested that the vowel in the RP pronunciation of words like bird, typically transcribed , is actually a sulcal schwa, retaining the sulcality of the original rhotic consonant.

See also 
Tongue rolling
Tillamook language

References 
Catford, J.C. 1977. Fundamental Problems in Phonetics. Indiana University Press.
Erickson, Blaine. 2003. 'On the development of English r' in Donka Minkova & Robert Stockwell, eds. Studies in the History of the English Language: A Millennial Perspective. Walter de Gruyter.
Jones, Daniel. 1967. The phoneme: its nature and use. Heffer.
Lass, Roger. 1984. Phonology: an introduction to basic concepts. Cambridge University Press.
Lowman, G. S. 1932. The phonetics of Albanian. Language 8(4), 271–293.
Stone, M. & A. Lundberg. 1996. Three-dimensional tongue surface shapes of English consonants and vowels. Journal of the Acoustical Society of America 99(6), 3728–3737.

Fricative consonants
Phonetics